André Schei Lindbæk (born 1 November 1977) is a Norwegian former footballer who last played in Germany for Rot-Weiss Essen. He formerly played for Nordstrand, Drøbak/Frogn, Abildsø, Kongsvinger, Skeid, Molde, Numancia, Viking, Las Palmas, Landskrona, FH, Køge and Start.

External links
 
 

1977 births
Living people
Footballers from Oslo
Norwegian footballers
Norway under-21 international footballers
Lyn Fotball players
Drøbak-Frogn IL players
Kongsvinger IL Toppfotball players
Skeid Fotball players
Molde FK players
CD Numancia players
Viking FK players
UD Las Palmas players
Landskrona BoIS players
Fimleikafélag Hafnarfjarðar players
Køge Boldklub players
IK Start players
Rot-Weiss Essen players
Eliteserien players
Segunda División players
Allsvenskan players
Danish 1st Division players
Norwegian expatriate footballers
Expatriate footballers in Spain
Norwegian expatriate sportspeople in Spain
Expatriate footballers in Sweden
Norwegian expatriate sportspeople in Sweden
Expatriate footballers in Iceland
Norwegian expatriate sportspeople in Iceland
Expatriate men's footballers in Denmark
Norwegian expatriate sportspeople in Denmark
Expatriate footballers in Germany
Norwegian expatriate sportspeople in Germany
Association football forwards